Esther Titilayo Akinlabi is a Nigerian South African Professor of Mechanical Engineering. She is the Director of the Pan African University for Life and Earth Sciences Institute (PAULESI), Nigeria. She was the Head of Department of Mechanical Engineering Science, Faculty of Engineering and the Built Environment, University of Johannesburg (UJ), South Africa.   She was also the Vice Dean for Teaching and Learning of the institution. She is a member of Organization for Women in Science for the Developing World (OWSD) and a member of African Academy of Sciences.

Early life and education

Esther Titilayo Akinlabi was born in Kabba, Kogi State, Nigeria. She graduated from St Barnabas Secondary School, Kabba and obtained her first degree in Mechanical Engineering from the Federal University of Technology, Akure in 1997. She obtained her M. Sc mechanical engineering from University of Port Harcourt, Rivers State, Nigeria in 2003 and  she moved to Nelson Mandela Metropolitan University, Port Elizabeth, South Africa for her PhD in 2010.

Awards and memberships 
Esther Titilayo Akinlabi is a member of the South African Young Academy of Science.  She is a registered member of the Engineering Council of South Africa (ECSA), the Council for the Regulation of Engineering in Nigeria (COREN), the South African Institution of Mechanical Engineering, the American Society of Mechanical Engineers, Nigerian Society of Engineers (NSE) and Organization for Women in Science for the Developing World (OWSD).

References 

Nigerian mechanical engineers
20th-century births
Living people
Year of birth missing (living people)
People from Kogi State
Federal University of Technology Akure alumni
University of Port Harcourt alumni
Nelson Mandela University alumni
Academic staff of the University of Johannesburg
Nigerian women engineers
21st-century South African engineers
South African women engineers